Niko Haapakoski (born 1 May 1996) is a Finnish volleyball player for Lentopalloseura ETTA and the Finnish national team.

He participated at the 2017 Men's European Volleyball Championship.

Sporting achievements

Clubs
National cup
 2020/2021  Estonian Cup, with Selver Tallinn

References

1996 births
Living people
Finnish men's volleyball players
Expatriate volleyball players in Estonia
Finnish expatriate sportspeople in Estonia